Love Duets is a full-length English-language debut duet album by the Filipino TV host, actress, and singer Toni Gonzaga (her fifth album over all) and the Filipino-American actor, singer, songwriter and model Sam Milby (his third album), both under the management of Star Records. The album was released on February 20, 2009, in the Philippines in CD and digital download formats and made available in many online stores like in iTunes Philippines and Amazon.com.

The first single from the album, "If Ever You're in My Arms Again", became a mainstream hit and entered many Philippine charts, including the Philippines Top 40 Hits, where it reached the number 2 spot. The track was also used as the theme song of the film My Big Love, produced by Star Cinema, in which Gonzaga and Milby play the lead roles. The second single, "Suddenly", received only limited airplay.

Track listing

Love Duets

Personnel
Credits taken from the album notes and Titik Pilipino
 Malou N. Santos & Annabelle M. Regalado-Borja – executive producers
 Jimmy Antiporda – over-all album producer
 Jonathan Manalo – supervising producer/A&R
 Roque "rox" Santos – over-all project coordinator
 Roxy Liquigan – star adprom director
 Nixon Sy – star adprom head for audio
 David Halili – promo specialist
 Peewee Apostol – head, star songs, inc.
 Beth Faustino – music copyright coordinator
 Barbie Chan – make-up artist for Sam Milby
 Jing Monis – Make-up artist for Toni Gonzaga
 Raymond Bajarias & Elfrn Vibar – stylists
 Andrew Castillo – graphic designer
 Jun De Leon of Wings Photography – album photographer

Certifications

References

Star Music albums
2009 albums
Toni Gonzaga albums